John Todd Terlesky (born May 30, 1961) is an American actor, film director, television director and screenwriter. As an actor, he is best known for playing Deathstalker in the 1987 film Deathstalker II, and Mike in Chopping Mall (1986).

Life and career
Terlesky was born in Cincinnati, Ohio, on May 30, 1961. Since the mid-1980s, Terlesky has acted in a number of films and television series. His first notable television role was in the NBC drama Legmen. His other television credits include The Facts of Life, V, Our House, Empty Nest, Walker, Texas Ranger, a recurring role on Guns of Paradise and co-starring in the sitcom The Last Frontier.

Some of Terlesky's film acting credits include Secret Admirer (1985), The Naked Cage (1986), Chopping Mall (1986), Valet Girls (1987), The Allnighter (1987), Deathstalker II (1987), Appointment with Death (1988), Damned River (1989) and Crazy People (1990).

In 1998, Terlesky made his directorial debut with the film The Pandora Project, co-directing with Jim Wynorski. He directed a number of other independent, direct-to-video and television films before getting involved in episodic television. Since 2006, he has directed episodes of Boston Legal, Grey's Anatomy, Ugly Betty, Drop Dead Diva, Human Target, Army Wives, Body of Proof, Gossip Girl, Castle, Agents of S.H.I.E.L.D., How To Get Away With Murder, and The Blacklist (TV series).

Filmography

Movies

Television

Personal life
Terlesky is married to actress Jayne Brook.

References

External links

1961 births
Living people
American male film actors
American male screenwriters
American male television actors
20th-century American male actors
American television directors
Film directors from Ohio
Male actors from Cincinnati
Screenwriters from Ohio
Film producers from Ohio